Sergey Mikhailovich Sarychev (Russian: Сергей Михайлович Сарычев; born on 1 August 1959) a is a Russian politician, who had served as the vice-governor of the Tyumen Oblast from 2018 to 2022, and the interim governor of the Tyumen Oblast in May 2018.

Biography

Sergey Sarychev was born on 1 August 1959 in the village of Vikulovo, Tyumen Oblast. He began his working career in 1978 working at the Omsk Motor-Building Plant. From 1978 to 1980, he served in the Soviet Army. Since 1983 he has been working in the Komsomol. Until 1987, he held the positions of instructor, second and first secretary of the Ishim City Committee of the Komsomol. From 1987 to 1991, he was the Secretary of the Tyumen Regional Committee of the Komsomol. From 1992 to 1997, Sarychev worked in the administration of the Tyumen Oblast as chairman of the committee for youth affairs and tourism.

In 1997, he was appointed Deputy Governor of the Tyumen Oblast.

From 2001 to 2003, Sarychev was the Deputy Governor of the Khanty-Mansi Autonomous Okrug, and the head of the department for organizing the activities of the Okrug government.

From 2003 to 2005, Sarychev was appointed Deputy Governor of the Tyumen Oblast, until since 2005 the term has changed to vice-governor.

From 18 May to 29 May 2018, Sarychev was the acting governor of the Tyumen Oblast. He became vice-governor once again when Aleksandr Moor was appointed acting governor and officially sworn in office on 14 September 2018.

In popular culture
He is a character in the novel by V. L. Strogalshchikov "Layer-2".

References

1959 births
Living people
United Russia politicians
Governors of Tyumen Oblast
People from Tyumen Oblast